500 Fifth Avenue is a 60-story,  office building on the northwest corner of Fifth Avenue and 42nd Street in Midtown Manhattan, New York City. The building was designed by Shreve, Lamb & Harmon in the Art Deco style and constructed from 1929 to 1931.

500 Fifth Avenue was designed with a facade of bronze, limestone, and terracotta at the base; it is clad with of brick above the fourth floor. While the lowest four floors contain a decorative exterior, little ornamentation is used above the base. The primary entrance is on Fifth Avenue, and storefronts are located at ground level. Upon its opening, the building contained design features including fast elevators, well-lit office units, and a floor plan that maximized the well-lit office space. The 1916 Zoning Resolution resulted in a structure that incorporated setbacks, resulting in the lower floors being larger than the upper floors.

500 Fifth Avenue was built for businessman Walter J. Salmon Sr. In the 1920s, prior to the building's development, the underlying land had become extremely valuable. Similarly to the much larger Empire State Building nine blocks south, which was constructed simultaneously, 500 Fifth Avenue's construction was highly coordinated. 500 Fifth Avenue opened in March 1931, but the structure garnered relatively little attention after the Empire State Building opened shortly afterward. The building was designated an official city landmark by the New York City Landmarks Preservation Commission in 2010.

Site 
500 Fifth Avenue occupies the northwestern corner of Fifth Avenue and 42nd Street in the Midtown Manhattan neighborhood of New York City. It is adjacent to the Manufacturers Trust Company Building to the north and the Salmon Tower Building to the west, while Bryant Park and the New York Public Library Main Branch are across 42nd Street to the south. 500 Fifth Avenue occupies a land lot with frontage of  along Fifth Avenue to the east and  along 42nd Street to the south. The building is assigned its own ZIP Code, 10110; it was one of 41 buildings in Manhattan that had their own ZIP Codes .

Mansions and other residences were constructed on Fifth Avenue in the late 19th century, and office and commercial buildings were being developed on the avenue by the beginning of the 20th century. By 1923, the Rider's Guide to New York City referred to the blocks of East 42nd Street between Park and Fifth Avenues as "Little Wall Street". The Real Estate Record & Guide called the area "the most valuable building site on Manhattan Island north of Wall Street".

Architecture 

Shreve, Lamb & Harmon designed the building in the Art Deco style. It was built simultaneously with the Empire State Building nine blocks south, which Shreve, Lamb & Harmon also designed. William F. Lamb, a lead associate at the firm, called 500 Fifth Avenue "a thoroughly frank expression of the requirements of an up-to-date office building." Because the design lacks historicist details, writer Eric Nash described the building as "perhaps the closest realization" of Eliel Saarinen's design for Chicago's Tribune Tower.

Form 
Because of limitations on building shape imposed by the 1916 Zoning Resolution, the building contains setbacks that make the lower floors larger than the upper floors. Varying designs were used on Fifth Avenue and on 42nd Street due to the different zoning requirements on each side. 500 Fifth includes numerous setbacks on each side, which are complex and asymmetrical. The first setback on 42nd Street is at a higher story than the first setback on Fifth Avenue. Namely, the Fifth Avenue side's setbacks are at the 18th, 22nd, and 25th stories, while the 42nd Street side's setbacks are at the 23rd, 28th, and 34th stories. The AIA Guide to New York City characterized the form as "a phallic pivot".

At the time of 500 Fifth Avenue's completion in 1931, the heights of skyscrapers in New York City were limited by the perceived economic feasibility of the upper floors. Despite being similar in design to the Empire State Building, 500 Fifth Avenue never became as prominent due to its asymmetrical massing, its lack of spire, and its smaller proportions. The only original ornamentation on 500 Fifth Avenue's roof were large red digits reading "500", but these have since been removed.

Facade 
Storefronts are located at ground level on the eastern and southern elevations. As a result of the creation of a special Fifth Avenue zoning district in 1929, new buildings on the avenue within Midtown had to include stores on their first two floors. The main entrance is flanked by triple-story pylons. Above the entrance is an allegorical limestone relief depicting the building's construction, which was carved by Edward Amateis. This relief depicts a gilded woman next to a model of the building, with a staff in her hand. Ornamentation depicting a pair of carved eagles is placed on the 42nd Street facade.

Lamb cited several factors in the "modern architectural treatment" of 500 Fifth, including the ornamentation and material usage. Bronze, limestone, and terracotta were used on the base's facade. The second through fourth floors contained decorated limestone piers as well as light-green spandrels ornamented with chevrons and folds. There were also shallow reliefs with depictions of fountains and foliation.

Above the fourth floor, the exterior was made mainly of brick. The facade above the fourth floor consisted of recessed brick spandrels with black terracotta panels, which provided "vertical accents" to the building. The idea for the terracotta-and-brick spandrels was probably taken from the Daily News Building, where a similar spandrel design was used. Little ornamentation is used above the base, except for terracotta panels with chevrons. The northern elevation of the facade is a largely uninterrupted brick wall with three vertical strips of black terracotta. In total, the building uses over 3.3 million bricks.

Features 
500 Fifth's design features included "fast and efficient" elevators, well-lit office units, and a floor plan that maximized the well-lit office space. Like the Empire State Building, 500 Fifth was designed from the top down; the floor plans within the upper stories were planned first, followed by the floor plans of the lower stories and the building's base. The main entrance leads to an outer lobby, the design of which was extensively modified after 550 Fifth Avenue's completion. The modern design of the outer lobby consists of pink-gray marble. A pair of griffins hold up a clock in the lobby; this is the only historicist decoration in the space. The inner lobby is clad with gold and gray veined marble.

The lowest two floors were designed with storefronts, set back from the full-height plate-glass windows on either side. There was also a  banking space on the second floor, with space for a private elevator and staircase from Fifth Avenue, as well as a subbasement for a banking vault and storage area.

Though the floor area is relatively small compared to other buildings of similar height, 500 Fifth Avenue nonetheless has had a high occupancy rate throughout its history.

History

Land acquisition 
From the 1890s to the 1910s, entrepreneur Walter J. Salmon purchased or leased several buildings along the northern side of West 42nd Street. His first acquisitions were 19 and 21 West 42nd in 1899 and 1901, respectively. In 1903, he signed a 20-year lease for the lot at the northwest corner of Fifth Avenue and 42nd Street, which was occupied by the Hotel Bristol, an eight-story structure built in 1875. The terms of the lease enabled Salmon to convert the hotel to commercial and office use. In 1905, he leased the brownstone rowhouses at 11–17 West 42nd Street and the six-story building at 27–29 West 42nd Street, and the following year, he acquired the properties at 23–25 West 42nd. When Salmon leased the remaining buildings between 3–9 West 42nd Street in 1915, he controlled  along the northern side of the street between Fifth Avenue and 29 West 42nd. His parcels totaled , which was considered to be the "minimum size necessary for profitable redevelopment".

Salmon's company, the Midpoint Realty Company, made an agreement with the site's owners, Gerry Estates Inc., for the corner lot's redevelopment in January 1922. Salmon signed a long-term lease for both the Bristol Building and the buildings at 3–9 West 42nd Street. In 1927, Salmon leased a four-story residence at 508 Fifth Avenue for his corner-lot development. The adjacent lots at 11–27 West 42nd would become the Salmon Tower Building, which was completed in 1928. However, the development of the corner site was delayed because of a legal dispute between Salmon and wool merchant Morton Meinhard, who was to provide half of the money for the site's development but did not have any say in the 1922 lease. The New York Supreme Court's Appellate Division ruled in June 1929 that Meinhard was entitled to a half-stake in the site.

Planning and construction 
In July 1929, Salmon announced his plans for the corner lot, a 58-story building at 500 Fifth Avenue, measuring  along Fifth Avenue and  along 42nd Street. The skyscraper was estimated to cost $2.35 million and be completed in late 1930. The Real Estate Record wrote that "the time appeared ripe for an improvement on this corner". The lot was considered the second-most-valuable undeveloped lot in Manhattan, behind 1 Wall Street. To finance construction, the developer issued $7 million worth of sinking fund bonds, .

Shreve, Lamb & Harmon were selected to design the new building. Because the zoning ordinances allowed higher buildings along 42nd Street than Fifth Avenue, Salmon merged the zoning lots of 500 and 508 Fifth Avenue, enabling him to construct a taller building than was usually permitted. This also required a separate design for the Fifth Avenue side of the building. Some  of rentable office space would be provided, as well as space for banking on the second and third floors, and retail on the first floor. The plans called for numerous architectural features including setbacks and "light courts". The New York City Department of Buildings received plans for 500 Fifth Avenue in October 1929. The following month, the Bristol Building's tenants were evicted, and that December the Bristol Building was demolished. The site was cleared in January 1930 and excavation of the foundation began the next month.

Similar to the Empire State Building nine blocks south, which was being constructed simultaneously by Shreve, Lamb & Harmon, each structural component at 500 Fifth Avenue was planned in advance. According to architect Richmond Shreve, a lead associate at the firm, the former's construction "required feats of organization in some respects never before attempted." 500 Fifth Avenue was erected by general contractor Charles T. Wills Inc. and steel contractor McClintic-Marshall Co. Assembly of the steel frame commenced in March 1930 and, with a system of derricks being used to expedite construction, the frame was topped out by that July. The building thus became the tallest skyscraper on Fifth Avenue for less than a month, as the Empire State Building subsequently surpassed it. Installation of the brickwork commenced in April 1930, concurrently with the steel frame's construction, and was completed by that September. By the end of the year, the building was essentially complete. The construction process employed up to 2,200 workers, and ultimately cost $4 million.

Use 
500 Fifth Avenue officially opened on March 3, 1931. John Tauranac, in his book The Empire State Building: The Making of a Landmark, wrote that upon 500 Fifth's completion, "The Building Record and Guide was calling Forty-second Street and Fifth Avenue 'the best known corner in the world'." In its early years, 500 Fifth Avenue was largely overlooked in the real estate community, as more attention was placed upon the Empire State Building, the world's tallest building at the time. Furthermore, office rental activity was affected by the Wall Street Crash of 1929. Conversely, at the beginning of 1931, Fifth Avenue was experiencing high demand for storefront space, with only 12 of 224 stores being unoccupied. 500 Fifth Avenue, along with 608 Fifth Avenue and the Empire State Building, were expected to add a combined 11 stores. Despite other developers' speculation that Salmon would construct a three-story residence at the roof, Salmon said the corner was "just a little to prominent for real home life".

Salmon had said in December 1930 that, although he foresaw it might take a long time to fill the space at 500 Fifth Avenue, "the enterprise was undertaken with the greatest faith in the future of midtown expansion and development." The 15th, 16th, and 20th floors were completely rented by May 1931. Rental activity continued and, by the end of the year, lessees included Electrolux, Western Universities Club, and several railroad companies. Other tenants in the mid-1930s included the Austrian and Japanese consulates; the Austrian consulate closed in 1938, when the country was taken over by Nazi Germany, and the Japanese consulate moved the following year to the International Building at Rockefeller Center. 500 Fifth Avenue was the original transmitter site for CBS Radio's New York City FM station (W67NY, later called WCBS-FM) in 1941.

The Mutual Insurance Company leased the adjacent lots at 508–514 Fifth Avenue from the Manufacturers Hanover Corporation (then known as the Manufacturers Trust Company) in 1944. Because Salmon's existing lease of 508 Fifth Avenue ran through 1965, Manufacturers Trust subleased the lot at 508 Fifth Avenue from Salmon. The Manufacturers Trust Company Building at 508–514 Fifth Avenue was completed in 1954, and ultimately contained four stories and a penthouse. The Manufacturers Trust penthouse was set back from the lot line at 508 Fifth Avenue because it rose above the maximum height permitted in the sublease agreement.

The land under 500 Fifth Avenue was owned separately from the building itself and, in 1955, the land was sold to Metropolitan Life Insurance, now known as MetLife. The New York Reading Laboratory, a reading room in the basement, operated during that decade. In 1980, a Yugoslavian bank on the 30th floor was bombed, with Croatian nationalists claiming responsibility, though no one was hurt and the structure suffered minimal damage. The facade was restored in the 1990s, and the building was owned by a Mexican investment group by 2004. Through the 21st century, 500 Fifth Avenue continued to be used as an office building. The LPC designated the building's facade as a landmark on December 14,  2010.

See also 

 Art Deco architecture of New York City
 List of New York City Designated Landmarks in Manhattan from 14th to 59th Streets

References

Notes

Citations

Sources

External links
 
 

1931 establishments in New York City
42nd Street (Manhattan)
Art Deco architecture in Manhattan
Art Deco skyscrapers
Bryant Park buildings
Office buildings completed in 1931
Fifth Avenue
New York City Designated Landmarks in Manhattan
Skyscraper office buildings in Manhattan